The Southland Province was a province of New Zealand from March 1861, when it split from Otago Province, until 1870, when it rejoined Otago.

History
Following the passage of the New Zealand Constitution Act 1852 by the British Parliament, New Zealand was divided into six new provinces in 1853, the southern part of the South Island was part of the Otago Province. Settlers in Murihiku, the southernmost part of the South Island purchased from Māori in 1853 by Walter Mantell, petitioned the government for separation from Otago. Petitioning started in 1857. The central government's General Assembly passed the New Provinces Act in 1858, and the Province of Southland was proclaimed in 1861. It was named Southland despite the wishes of many settlers and Māori, who preferred Murihiku.

The province started to accumulate debt, whereas Otago prospered due to the Central Otago Gold Rush. By the late 1860s, most settlers wanted to become part of the Otago Province again, and this was achieved in 1870.

Area
The province was much smaller than the present-day Southland region. The area was bounded by the Mataura River (east), the Waiau River (west), and a line from Eyre Peak to Lake Manapouri (north). Stewart Island was purchased by the Crown in 1863 and added to the area. The capital and largest settlement of Southland Province was Invercargill.

Railways
The Southland Province began a number of railway projects. The branch line to Bluff (which was known as Campbelltown until 1917) opened on 5 February 1867. It was built to international standard gauge of 1,435 mm (4 feet 8.5 inches), wider than the national gauge of 1,067 mm (3 feet 6 inches) gauge. When the central government passed legislation setting a single standard for track gauges, the line was converted to the new gauge in a single day, 18 December 1875. The railway later became part of the New Zealand Railways Department.

Anniversary Day
Founded: 1 April 1861 

New Zealand law provides an anniversary day for each province.

Superintendents
The Southland Province had three Superintendents:

Legislation
 1861 Breaks away from Otago Province
 1870 Reunited with Otago

Notes

References

External links
 A page containing a map of the old provincial boundaries is available here.

Southland, New Zealand
Provinces of New Zealand
States and territories established in 1861
1870 disestablishments in New Zealand
1861 establishments in New Zealand